ASEC Mimosas is a professional basketball team that is based in Abidjan, Ivory Coast. They used to compete in the Ivorian Basketball Championship. Mimosas is a two-time African continental champion, having won the FIBA Africa Clubs Champions Cup in 1989 and 2000.

Honours
 FIBA Africa Clubs Champions Cup (2)
 Champion: 1989 and 2000
 Runners-up: 1981 and 2002

Notable players 

 Djadji Clément
 Amadou Dioum
 Fofana Lassina
 Malick Daho
 Ello Dingui
 Tapé Williams

References

External links
Official website

Basketball teams in Ivory Coast